John Torrens (1768–1851) was an Irish Anglican priest in the 19th-century.

Torrnes was  educated at Trinity College, Dublin. He was Archdeacon of Dublin from 1819 until his death on 9 June 1851.

References

1768 births
1851 deaths
Alumni of Trinity College Dublin
Archdeacons of Dublin
19th-century Irish Anglican priests